The Tour de Langkawi is a multiple stage bicycle race held in Malaysia. It is named after the archipelago Langkawi, where the first edition started and finished. The race has been held annually since 1996, primarily in February. It usually consists of 10-day-long segments (stages) over 10 days, but has been reduced to eight stages over recent years. While the route changes each year, the Genting Highlands climb, the toughest in the tour, is always included. Tour de Langkawi is sanctioned by the International Cycling Union (UCI) as a 2.HC road race in the UCI Asia Tour calendar. The race became part of the UCI ProSeries in 2020.

All stages are timed to the finish. Times for each completed stage are compounded; the rider with the lowest aggregate time is the leader of the race and gets to wear the yellow jersey. While the general classification garners the most attention, there are other contests held within the Tour: the points classification for sprinters, the mountains classification for climbers, the Asian rider classification for Asian riders, the team classification for competing teams, and the Asian team classification for competing Asian teams.

History
The Tour de Langkawi was conceived by former Malaysian Prime Minister Mahathir bin Mohamad to put Malaysia "on the world sporting and tourism map". The first race was held in 1996.  It was Asia's richest bicycle race with total prize money of RM1.1 million.

Organisers officially cancelled the second stage, though an unofficial shortened version was held. Since then, the race has never re-visited Sabah or Sarawak, except for the 2020 edition.

The final stage of the race was cancelled twice due to heavy rain in 2003 and 2006.

During the first stage in 2004, police allowed vehicles onto the course by mistake. Riders mutually decided to neutralise the stage.

In 2008, the Genting Highlands climb stage was replaced by Fraser's Hill.  Due to 150,000 visitors converging on the Genting Highlands resort area to celebrate Chinese New Year, officials would not be able to close roads along the race route to insure the safety of riders and the public. The Genting Highlands climb stage returned to the Tour in 2009.

Due to the COVID-19 pandemic, the 2021 race that was supposed to happen between January 30 to February 6 was cancelled after initial consideration of postponement to September in the same year. The event made its return in 2022, initially scheduled from March 3 to 10 but was then postponed twice, first to June 11 to 18, then again to October 11 to 18.

Past winners

General classification

Points classification

Mountains classification

Asian rider classification

Team classification

Asian team classification

References

External links
Tour de Langkawi at cyclingnews.com
Tour de Langkawi at cyclingarchives.com
Tour de Langkawi at the-sports.org
Tour de Langkawi at cqranking.com

 
Cycle races in Malaysia
UCI Asia Tour races
Recurring sporting events established in 1996
1996 establishments in Malaysia